Maicel is a given name. Notable people with the name include:

Maicel Malone-Wallace (born 1969), American sprinter
Maicel Uibo (born 1992), Estonian decathlete

Unisex given names